Peter Donaldson may refer to:

Peter Donaldson (1945–2015), British radio announcer and newsreader
Pete Donaldson (born 1981), radio and TV presenter
Peter Donaldson (actor) (1953–2011), Canadian actor
Peter Donaldson (economist) (1934–2002), British economist, academic, author, and radio and television broadcaster
Peter S. Donaldson, American Shakespeare scholar